Jayne Houdyshell  (born September 25, 1953) is an American, Tony-winning actress known for her performances on stage and screen. 

Houdyshell made her Broadway debut in the 2005 production of It's a Wonderful Life. The following year she earned her first Tony Award nomination for her role as Ann in the play Well in 2006. Since then she has received four more Tony Award nominations for her performances in the revival of Stephen Sondheim's musical Follies in 2012, the new play by Lucas Hnath A Doll's House, Part 2 in 2017, and the revival of Meredith Willson's The Music Man in 2022. She won the Tony Award for Best Featured Actress in a Play for the 2016 play The Humans. 

She is also known for her supporting film roles in Alexander Payne's science fiction comedy Downsizing (2017) and Greta Gerwig's period piece Little Women, and for reprising her role in the 2021 film adaptation of The Humans.

She has had recurring roles in various television series, including Third Watch, Law & Order, Law & Order: Special Victims Unit, Law & Order: Criminal Intent, Blue Bloods, and The Good Fight. She currently stars as "Bunny Folger" on the hit Hulu comedy series Only Murders in the Building, for which she was nominated for the Screen Actors Guild Award for Outstanding Performance by an Ensemble in a Comedy Series.

Biography

Early life
Raised in Topeka, Kansas, she is the youngest of four daughters born to Galen "Buzz" Houdyshell and Louella Taylor. She graduated from Topeka High School in 1971, and she went on to Emporia State University then on to graduate with honors from the Academy of Dramatic Art at Oakland University in Rochester, Michigan in 1974.

Stage
Since the mid-1970s, she has appeared in more than 200 plays at regional theaters throughout the United States, including the Meadow Brook Theater, Attic Theater, Missouri Repertory Theater, Asolo Repertory Theatre, Alabama Shakespeare Festival, Yale Repertory Theater, McCarter Theater, Delaware Theater Company, Wilma Theater, Syracuse Stage, Studio Arena, GeVa Theater, Actors Theater of Louisville, Steppenwolf Theater, American Conservatory Theater, Timber Lake Playhouse, Old Creamery Theatre, Totem Pole Playhouse, Peterborough Players, and others.

Houdyshell reminisces that, after moving to Manhattan in 1980, “I was traveling all that 20 years...There was a community of actors who did that. We were itinerant actors who just continually moved around the country from theater to theater and job to job."

In New York, she is known for her role as "Ann Kron" in the Broadway production of Well by Lisa Kron. It was a role that garnered her a Tony Award nomination in 2006. She won a Theater World Award and an Obie Award, Outstanding Performance, for the Off-Broadway production of Well, which ran in 2004 at the Public Theater.

She received the 2005 Joseph Jefferson Award, Supporting Actress, Play for her performance in The Pain and the Itch for Steppenwolf Theatre Company and a 2005 Barrymore Award, Outstanding Supporting Actress in a Play for her work in The Clean House at the Wilma Theater in Philadelphia.

Houdyshell's Broadway credits include Wicked, Well, Bye Bye Birdie, and The Importance of Being Earnest. She played the role of "Hattie" in the 2011 revival of Follies, and received a 2012 Tony Award nomination, Featured Actress in a Musical for her performance. Houdyshell played the Nurse in the 2013 Broadway revival of Romeo and Juliet.

She appeared in The Humans as "Deirdre Blake", first in its Off-Broadway engagement at the Roundabout Theatre Company in September 2015 to December 2015, and then the Broadway production of the play which opened at the Helen Hayes Theatre on February 18, 2016. For The Humans she won the 2016 Tony Award, Featured Actress in a Play, the 2016 Drama Desk Award, Outstanding Ensemble Performance, and the Obie Award, Performance. She was also nominated for the 2016 Outer Critics Circle Award, Outstanding Actress in a Play.

In 2017 she played Ann Marie in Lucas Hnath's A Doll's House, Part 2.

Houdyshell's other New York credits include Harrison, TX: Three Plays by Horton Foote at Primary Stages, Coraline, The New Century, at the Mitzi E. Newhouse Theater at Lincoln Center (2008); The Receptionist at the Manhattan Theater Club (2007); Much Ado About Nothing (Delacorte Theatre, 2004); Fighting Words, and The Pain and the Itch at Playwrights Horizons (2009); Attempts on Her Life at Soho Rep; and True Love at the Zipper Theater (2001).

In April 2019, Houdyshell returned to Broadway as the Earl of Gloucester in the Sam Gold directed production of King Lear, with Glenda Jackson in the title role.
Houdyshell plays Eulalie Mackecknie Shinn in the 2022 revival of The Music Man, starring Hugh Jackman and Sutton Foster.

Television and film
Houdyshell's television credits include appearances on Third Watch, Law & Order, Law & Order: Special Victims Unit, Law & Order: Criminal Intent, Blue Bloods, and The Good Fight, and as Bunny Folger on Only Murders in the Building.

She has appeared in numerous films, including Changing Lanes (2002) with Ben Affleck, Maid in Manhattan (2002) with Jennifer Lopez, Garden State (2004) with Zach Braff and Natalie Portman, Trust the Man (2006) with Julianne Moore, and Everybody's Fine (2009) with Robert DeNiro, Kate Beckinsale, Drew Barrymore, and Sam Rockwell. She also had a role in the 2010 film The Bounty Hunter with Jennifer Aniston and Gerard Butler

In 2010, she starred as the Stage Manager in the film Morning Glory opposite Harrison Ford, Diane Keaton, and Rachel McAdams.

In 2015, she starred as Rose Offer on the NBC limited series American Odyssey opposite Anna Friel and Peter Facinelli.

In 2017, she appeared in Alexander Payne's science fiction comedy feature Downsizing opposite Matt Damon.

In 2018, she starred on the third season of the ABC thriller Quantico as The Widow.

In 2019, she appeared as the housekeeper Hannah in Greta Gerwig's critically acclaimed and Oscar-nominated film adaptation of Little Women starring Saoirse Ronan, Emma Watson, Florence Pugh, Eliza Scanlen, Laura Dern, Timothée Chalamet, and Meryl Streep.

In 2021, she reprised her Tony-winning role of Deidre Blake in The Humans, the film adaptation of her Broadway play. The movie co-starred Richard Jenkins, Amy Schumer, Beanie Feldstein, Steven Yeun, and June Squibb. It had its world premiere at the 2021 Toronto International Film Festival on September 12, 2021. The film was released by A24 on November 24, 2021, both in theaters and on Showtime.

In 2021 and 2022, she played the memorable role of Bunny Folger on seasons 1 and 2 of the hit, Emmy-nominated Hulu series Only Murders in the Building, opposite Steve Martin, Martin Short, and Selena Gomez.

Her next movie Causeway is a psychological drama film directed by Lila Neugebauer and starring Jennifer Lawrence and Brian Tyree Henry. It had its world premiere at the 2022 Toronto International Film Festival on September 10, 2022. It was released theatrically and on Apple TV+ on November 4, 2022.

Filmography

Film

Television

Theatre

Awards and nominations

References

External links
 
 
 

1953 births
Living people
Actresses from Kansas
American film actresses
American musical theatre actresses
American stage actresses
American television actresses
Oakland University alumni
Actors from Topeka, Kansas
Tony Award winners
Obie Award recipients
Theatre World Award winners
20th-century American actresses
21st-century American actresses